Guarea venenata is a species of plant in the family Meliaceae. It is found in Brazil and Colombia. It is threatened by habitat loss.

References

venenata
Flora of Brazil
Flora of Colombia
Taxonomy articles created by Polbot